This is a list of recognized Hungarian dog breeds.

Hunting dogs 
Vizsla
Wirehaired Vizsla
Transylvanian Hound or Erdélyi Kopó, officially 'Hungarian Hound – Transylvanian Scent Hound'
Magyar Agár or Hungarian Greyhound

Guard and shepherd dogs 
Kuvasz
Komondor
Mudi
Puli
Pumi

See also
 List of dog breeds

References

FCI breeds
Dog breeds originating in Hungary
Rare dog breeds
Scent hounds